This is a list of the mammal species recorded in Botswana. There are 170 mammal species in Botswana, of which one is critically endangered, one is endangered, six are vulnerable, and six are near threatened.

The following tags are used to highlight each species' conservation status as assessed by the International Union for Conservation of Nature:

Some species were assessed using an earlier set of criteria. Species assessed using this system have the following instead of near threatened and least concern categories:

Subclass: Theria

Infraclass: Eutheria

Order: Macroscelidea (elephant shrews)

Often called sengi, the elephant shrews or jumping shrews are native to southern Africa. Their common English name derives from their elongated flexible snout and their resemblance to the true shrews.

Family: Macroscelididae (elephant shrews)
Genus: Elephantulus
 Short-snouted elephant shrew, E. brachyrhynchus 
 Bushveld elephant shrew, E. intufi 
 Eastern rock elephant shrew, E. myurus 
 Western rock elephant shrew, E. rupestris 
Genus: Macroscelides
 Short-eared elephant shrew, M. proboscideus

Order: Tubulidentata (aardvarks)

The order Tubulidentata consists of a single species, the aardvark. Tubulidentata are characterised by their teeth which lack a pulp cavity and form thin tubes which are continuously worn down and replaced.

Family: Orycteropodidae
Genus: Orycteropus
 Aardvark, O. afer

Order: Hyracoidea (hyraxes)

The hyraxes are any of four species of fairly small, thickset, herbivorous mammals in the order Hyracoidea. About the size of a domestic cat they are well-furred, with rounded bodies and a stumpy tail. They are native to Africa and the Middle East.

Family: Procaviidae (hyraxes)
Genus: Heterohyrax
 Yellow-spotted rock hyrax, Heterohyrax brucei LC
Genus: Procavia
 Cape hyrax, Procavia capensis LC

Order: Proboscidea (elephants)

The elephants comprise three living species and are the largest living land animals.
Family: Elephantidae (elephants)
Genus: Loxodonta
African bush elephant, L. africana

Order: Primates

The order Primates contains humans and their closest relatives: lemurs, lorisoids, tarsiers, monkeys, and apes.

Suborder: Strepsirrhini
Infraorder: Lemuriformes
Superfamily: Lorisoidea
Family: Galagidae
Genus: Galago
 Mohol bushbaby, Galago moholi LR/lc
Suborder: Haplorhini
Infraorder: Simiiformes
Parvorder: Catarrhini
Superfamily: Cercopithecoidea
Family: Cercopithecidae (Old World monkeys)
Genus: Chlorocebus
 Malbrouck, Chlorocebus cynosuros LR/lc
 Vervet monkey, Chlorocebus pygerythrus LR/lc
Genus: Papio
 Chacma baboon, Papio ursinus LR/lc

Order: Rodentia (rodents)

Rodents make up the largest order of mammals, with over 40% of mammalian species. They have two incisors in the upper and lower jaw which grow continually and must be kept short by gnawing. Most rodents are small though the capybara can weigh up to 45 kg (100 lb).

Suborder: Hystricomorpha
Family: Bathyergidae
Genus: Cryptomys
 Damaraland mole-rat, Fukomys damarensis LC
Family: Hystricidae (Old World porcupines)
Genus: Hystrix
 Cape porcupine, Hystrix africaeaustralis LC
Family: Thryonomyidae (cane rats)
Genus: Thryonomys
 Greater cane rat, Thryonomys swinderianus LC
Suborder: Sciurognathi
Family: Sciuridae (squirrels)
Subfamily: Xerinae
Tribe: Xerini
Genus: Xerus
 South African ground squirrel, Xerus inauris LC
Tribe: Protoxerini
Genus: Paraxerus
 Smith's bush squirrel, Paraxerus cepapi LC
Family: Gliridae (dormice)
Subfamily: Graphiurinae
Genus: Graphiurus
 Small-eared dormouse, Graphiurus microtis LC
 Rock dormouse, Graphiurus platyops LC
Family: Nesomyidae
Subfamily: Dendromurinae
Genus: Dendromus
 Gray climbing mouse, Dendromus melanotis LC
 Brants's climbing mouse, Dendromus mesomelas LC
Genus: Malacothrix
 Gerbil mouse, Malacothrix typica LC
Genus: Steatomys
 Kreb's fat mouse, Steatomys krebsii LC
 Tiny fat mouse, Steatomys parvus LC
 Fat mouse, Steatomys pratensis LC
Subfamily: Cricetomyinae
Genus: Cricetomys
 Gambian pouched rat, Cricetomys gambianus LC
Genus: Saccostomus
 South African pouched mouse, Saccostomus campestris LC
Family: Muridae (mice, rats, voles, gerbils, hamsters, etc.)
Subfamily: Deomyinae
Genus: Acomys
 Spiny mouse, Acomys spinosissimus LC
Subfamily: Otomyinae
Genus: Otomys
 Angoni vlei rat, Otomys angoniensis LC
 Large vlei rat, Otomys maximus LC
Genus: Parotomys
 Brants's whistling rat, Parotomys brantsii LC
Subfamily: Gerbillinae
Genus: Desmodillus
 Cape short-eared gerbil, Desmodillus auricularis LC
Genus: Gerbillurus
 Hairy-footed gerbil, Gerbillurus paeba LC
Genus: Tatera
 Highveld gerbil, Tatera brantsii LC
 Bushveld gerbil, Tatera leucogaster LC
Subfamily: Murinae
Genus: Aethomys
 Red rock rat, Aethomys chrysophilus LC
 Namaqua rock rat, Aethomys namaquensis LC
Genus: Dasymys
 Angolan marsh rat, Dasymys nudipes NT
Genus: Lemniscomys
 Single-striped grass mouse, Lemniscomys rosalia LC
Genus: Mastomys
 Southern multimammate mouse, Mastomys coucha LC
 Natal multimammate mouse, Mastomys natalensis LC
 Shortridge's multimammate mouse, Mastomys shortridgei LC
Genus: Mus
 Desert pygmy mouse, Mus indutus LC
 Setzer's pygmy mouse, Mus setzeri LC
Genus: Rhabdomys
 Four-striped grass mouse, Rhabdomys pumilio LC
Genus: Thallomys
 Black-tailed tree rat, Thallomys nigricauda LC
 Acacia rat, Thallomys paedulcus LC
Genus: Zelotomys
 Woosnam's broad-headed mouse, Zelotomys woosnami LC

Order: Lagomorpha (lagomorphs)

The lagomorphs comprise two families, Leporidae (hares and rabbits), and Ochotonidae (pikas). Though they can resemble rodents, and were classified as a superfamily in that order until the early 20th century, they have since been considered a separate order. They differ from rodents in a number of physical characteristics, such as having four incisors in the upper jaw rather than two.

Family: Leporidae (rabbits, hares)
Genus: Pronolagus
 Jameson's red rock hare, Pronolagus randensis LR/lc
Genus: Lepus
 Cape hare, Lepus capensis LR/lc
 African savanna hare, Lepus microtis LR/lc

Order: Erinaceomorpha (hedgehogs and gymnures)

The order Erinaceomorpha contains a single family, Erinaceidae, which comprise the hedgehogs and gymnures. The hedgehogs are easily recognised by their spines while gymnures look more like large rats.

Family: Erinaceidae (hedgehogs)
Subfamily: Erinaceinae
Genus: Atelerix
 Southern African hedgehog, Atelerix frontalis LR/lc

Order: Soricomorpha (shrews, moles, and solenodons)

The "shrew-forms" are insectivorous mammals. The shrews and solenodons closely resemble mice while the moles are stout-bodied burrowers.

Family: Soricidae (shrews)
Subfamily: Crocidurinae
Genus: Crocidura
 Reddish-gray musk shrew, Crocidura cyanea LC
 Bicolored musk shrew, Crocidura fuscomurina LC
 Lesser red musk shrew, Crocidura hirta LC
 Swamp musk shrew, Crocidura mariquensis LC
 African giant shrew, Crocidura olivieri LC
Genus: Suncus
 Greater dwarf shrew, Suncus lixus LC
 Lesser dwarf shrew, Suncus varilla LC

Order: Chiroptera (bats)

The bats' most distinguishing feature is that their forelimbs are developed as wings, making them the only mammals capable of flight. Bat species account for about 20% of all mammals.
Family: Pteropodidae (flying foxes, Old World fruit bats)
Subfamily: Pteropodinae
Genus: Eidolon
 Straw-coloured fruit bat, Eidolon helvum LC
Genus: Epomophorus
 Peters's epauletted fruit bat, Epomophorus crypturus LC
 Wahlberg's epauletted fruit bat, Epomophorus wahlbergi LC
Family: Vespertilionidae
Subfamily: Kerivoulinae
Genus: Kerivoula
 Lesser woolly bat, Kerivoula lanosa LC
Subfamily: Vespertilioninae
Genus: Glauconycteris
 Butterfly bat, Glauconycteris variegata LC
Genus: Laephotis
 Botswanan long-eared bat, Laephotis botswanae LC
Genus: Neoromicia
 Cape serotine, Neoromicia capensis LC
 Banana pipistrelle, Neoromicia nanus LC
 Rendall's serotine, Neoromicia rendalli LC
 Somali serotine, Neoromicia somalicus LC
 Zulu serotine, Neoromicia zuluensis LC
Genus: Nycticeinops
 Schlieffen's bat, Nycticeinops schlieffeni LC
Genus: Pipistrellus
 Rüppell's pipistrelle, Pipistrellus rueppelli LC
 Rusty pipistrelle, Pipistrellus rusticus LC
Genus: Scotophilus
 African yellow bat, Scotophilus dinganii LC
 White-bellied yellow bat, Scotophilus leucogaster LC
 Greenish yellow bat, Scotophilus viridis LC
Subfamily: Miniopterinae
Genus: Miniopterus
 Natal long-fingered bat, Miniopterus natalensis NT
Family: Molossidae
Genus: Chaerephon
 Nigerian free-tailed bat, Chaerephon nigeriae LC
 Little free-tailed bat, Chaerephon pumila LC
 Chapin's free-tailed bat, Chaerephon shortridgei NT
Genus: Mops
 Angolan free-tailed bat, Mops condylurus LC
 Midas free-tailed bat, Mops midas LC
Genus: Sauromys
 Roberts's flat-headed bat, Sauromys petrophilus LC
Genus: Tadarida
 Egyptian free-tailed bat, Tadarida aegyptiaca LC
Family: Emballonuridae
Genus: Taphozous
 Mauritian tomb bat, Taphozous mauritianus LC
 Egyptian tomb bat, Taphozous perforatus LC
Family: Nycteridae
Genus: Nycteris
 Hairy slit-faced bat, Nycteris hispida LC
 Large-eared slit-faced bat, Nycteris macrotis LC
 Egyptian slit-faced bat, Nycteris thebaica LC
Family: Rhinolophidae
Subfamily: Rhinolophinae
Genus: Rhinolophus
Blasius's horseshoe bat, R. blasii 
 Darling's horseshoe bat, Rhinolophus darlingi LC
 Dent's horseshoe bat, Rhinolophus denti DD
 Rüppell's horseshoe bat, Rhinolophus fumigatus LC
 Hildebrandt's horseshoe bat, Rhinolophus hildebrandti LC
 Bushveld horseshoe bat, Rhinolophus simulator LC
Subfamily: Hipposiderinae
Genus: Cloeotis
 Percival's trident bat, Cloeotis percivali VU
Genus: Hipposideros
 Sundevall's roundleaf bat, Hipposideros caffer LC
 Commerson's roundleaf bat, Hipposideros marungensis NT

Order: Pholidota (pangolins)

The order Pholidota comprises the eight species of pangolin. Pangolins are anteaters and have the powerful claws, elongated snout and long tongue seen in the other unrelated anteater species.

Family: Manidae
Genus: Manis
 Ground pangolin, Manis temminckii LR/nt

Order: Carnivora (carnivorans)

There are over 260 species of carnivorans, the majority of which feed primarily on meat. They have a characteristic skull shape and dentition.
Suborder: Feliformia
Family: Felidae (cats)
Subfamily: Felinae
Genus: Acinonyx
Cheetah, Acinonyx jubatus VU
Southeast African cheetah, A. j. jubatus
Genus: Caracal
 Caracal, Caracal caracal LC
Genus: Felis
 Black-footed cat, Felis nigripes VU
African wildcat, F. lybica 
Genus: Leptailurus
 Serval, Leptailurus serval LC
Subfamily: Pantherinae
Genus: Panthera
 Lion, Panthera leo VU
 Panthera leo melanochaita
 Leopard, Panthera pardus VU
 African leopard, P. p. pardus
Family: Viverridae
Subfamily: Viverrinae
Genus: Civettictis
 African civet, Civettictis civetta LC
Genus: Genetta
 Common genet, Genetta genetta LC
 Rusty-spotted genet, Genetta maculata LC
Family: Herpestidae (mongooses)
Genus: Atilax
 Marsh mongoose, Atilax paludinosus LC
Genus: Cynictis
 Yellow mongoose, Cynictis penicillata LC
Genus: Helogale
 Common dwarf mongoose, Helogale parvula LC
Genus: Herpestes
 Egyptian mongoose, Herpestes ichneumon LC
Common slender mongoose, Herpestes sanguineus LC
Genus: Ichneumia
 White-tailed mongoose, Ichneumia albicauda LC
Genus: Mungos
 Banded mongoose, Mungos mungo LC
Genus: Paracynictis
 Selous' mongoose, Paracynictis selousi LC
Genus: Suricata
 Meerkat, Suricata suricatta LC
Family: Hyaenidae (hyaenas)
Genus: Crocuta
 Spotted hyena, Crocuta crocuta LC
Genus: Parahyaena
 Brown hyena, P. brunnea NT
Genus: Proteles
 Aardwolf, Proteles cristatus LC
Suborder: Caniformia
Family: Canidae (dogs, foxes)
Genus: Lupulella
 Side-striped jackal, L. adusta 
 Black-backed jackal, L. mesomelas 
Genus: Vulpes
 Cape fox, Vulpes chama LC
Genus: Otocyon
 Bat-eared fox, Otocyon megalotis LC
Genus: Lycaon
 African wild dog, Lycaon pictus EN
Family: Mustelidae (mustelids)
Genus: Ictonyx
 Striped polecat, Ictonyx striatus LC
Genus: Poecilogale
 African striped weasel, Poecilogale albinucha LC
Genus: Mellivora
 Honey badger, Mellivora capensis 
Genus: Lutra
 Speckle-throated otter, Lutra maculicollis NT
Genus: Aonyx
 African clawless otter, Aonyx capensis NT

Order: Perissodactyla (odd-toed ungulates)

The odd-toed ungulates are browsing and grazing mammals. They are usually large to very large, and have relatively simple stomachs and a large middle toe.

Family: Equidae (horses etc.)
Genus: Equus
 Burchell's zebra, Equus quagga burchellii NT
 Chapman's zebra, Equus quagga chapmani EN
Family: Rhinocerotidae
Genus: Diceros
 Southern black rhinoceros, Diceros bicornis bicornis EX
 Chobe black rhinoceros, Diceros bicornis chobiensis CR
 South-central black rhinoceros, Diceros bicornis minor CR
Genus: Ceratotherium
 Southern white rhinoceros, Ceratotherium simum simum NT

Order: Artiodactyla (even-toed ungulates)

The even-toed ungulates are ungulates whose weight is borne about equally by the third and fourth toes, rather than mostly or entirely by the third as in perissodactyls. There are about 220 artiodactyl species, including many that are of great economic importance to humans.

Family: Suidae (pigs)
Subfamily: Phacochoerinae
Genus: Phacochoerus
 Common warthog, Phacochoerus africanus LR/lc
Subfamily: Suinae
Genus: Potamochoerus
 Bushpig, Potamochoerus larvatus LR/lc
Family: Hippopotamidae (hippopotamuses)
Genus: Hippopotamus
 Hippopotamus, Hippopotamus amphibius VU
Family: Giraffidae (giraffe, okapi)
Genus: Giraffa
 Giraffe, Giraffa camelopardalis VU
Family: Bovidae (cattle, antelope, sheep, goats)
Subfamily: Alcelaphinae
Genus: Alcelaphus
 Hartebeest, Alcelaphus buselaphus LR/cd
Genus: Connochaetes
 Blue wildebeest, Connochaetes taurinus LR/cd
Genus: Damaliscus
 Topi, Damaliscus lunatus LR/cd
Subfamily: Antilopinae
Genus: Antidorcas
 Springbok antelope, Antidorcas marsupialis LR/cd
Genus: Oreotragus
 Klipspringer, Oreotragus oreotragus LR/cd
Genus: Ourebia
 Oribi, Ourebia ourebi LR/cd
Genus: Raphicerus
 Steenbok, Raphicerus campestris LR/lc
 Sharpe's grysbok, Raphicerus sharpei LR/cd
Subfamily: Bovinae
Genus: Syncerus
 African buffalo, Syncerus caffer LR/cd
Genus: Tragelaphus
 Nyala, T. angasii LC introduced
 Common eland, Tragelaphus oryx LR/cd
 Bushbuck, Tragelaphus scriptus LR/lc
 Sitatunga, Tragelaphus spekii LR/nt
 Greater kudu, Tragelaphus strepsiceros LR/cd
Subfamily: Cephalophinae
Genus: Sylvicapra
 Common duiker, Sylvicapra grimmia LR/lc
Subfamily: Hippotraginae
Genus: Hippotragus
 Roan antelope, Hippotragus equinus LR/cd
 Sable antelope, Hippotragus niger LR/cd
Genus: Oryx
 Gemsbok, Oryx gazella LR/cd
Subfamily: Peleinae
Genus: Pelea
 Grey rhebok, Pelea capreolus LC
Subfamily: Aepycerotinae
Genus: Aepyceros
 Impala, Aepyceros melampus LR/cd
Subfamily: Reduncinae
Genus: Kobus
 Waterbuck, Kobus ellipsiprymnus LR/cd
 Lechwe, Kobus leche LR/cd
 Puku, Kobus vardonii LR/cd
Genus: Redunca
 Southern reedbuck, Redunca arundinum LR/cd
 Mountain reedbuck, Redunca fulvorufula LC

Notes

References

See also
List of chordate orders
Lists of mammals by region
List of prehistoric mammals
Mammal classification
List of mammals described in the 2000s

Botswana
Mammals

Botswana